Gluzman is a surname shared by several notable people:
 Mikhail Gluzman (born 1967), Ukrainian-Australian chess International Master
 Rita Gluzman, convicted murderer 
 Semyon Gluzman (born 1946), Ukrainian psychiatrist 
 Vadim Gluzman (born 1973), Ukrainian-born Israeli classical violinist

Germanic-language surnames
Jewish surnames
Occupational surnames